Asuman Karakoyun (born 16 July 1990) is a retired Turkish female volleyball player. She played for Eczacıbaşı VitrA and wears the number 8.
 On 23 August 2016, she announced her retirement at the age of 26 after more than one year's absence from the sport due to knee injury.

Clubs
 Eczacıbaşı VitrA (2010- )

Awards

Individuals
 2012-13 Turkish League Final Series "Best Server"

Club
 2011 Turkish Super Cup -  Champion, with Eczacıbaşı VitrA
 2011-12 Turkish Women's Volleyball Cup -  Champion, with Eczacıbaşı VitrA
 2011-12 Aroma Women's Volleyball League -  Champion, with Eczacıbaşı VitrA
 2012 Turkish Volleyball Super Cup -  Champion, with Eczacıbaşı VitrA
 2012-2013 Turkish Women's Volleyball Cup -  Runner-Up, with Eczacıbaşı VitrA
 2012-2013 Turkish Women's Volleyball League -  Runner-Up, with Eczacıbaşı VitrA

See also
 Turkish women in sports

References

External links
 

1990 births
Living people
Turkish women's volleyball players